Malta sent a team of 35 athletes to the 2006 Commonwealth Games in Melbourne.

Malta had won two bronze medals at previous Commonwealth Games.

Medals

Silver
Shooting:
Rebecca Attard Madyson, Women's Trap Singles

Bronze
Shooting:
William Chetcuti, Men's Double Trap

Malta's Commonwealth Games Team 2006

Basketball

Women's
Caroline Fenech
Kirsten Micallef
Doreen Parnis
Wismay Schembri
Bever Lee Zammit
Dawn Aquilina
Antoinette Borg
Lucienne Bezzina
Fiona Schembri
Josephine Grima
Sara Pace
Rachel Camilleri

Cycling
Nick Formosa
David Treacy
Jack Schiavone
Etienne Bonello
Stephania Magri

Lawn bowls

Men's
Joe Attard
Leonard Callus
Shaun J Parnis
Victor A Brincat
Alfred J Vella
Francis M Vella

Shooting

Double Trap
William Chetcuti
Rodney Micallef

Trap
Frans Pace
Stanley Cardona

Squash
Joe Desira (Men's singles)

Swimming
Angela Galea (Women's Butterfly at 50m, 100m & 200m)

Table tennis
 Simon Gerada & Wayne Gerada (Men's doubles)

Weightlifting
Lindsay Borg (Women's 75 kg)
Rebecca Aquilina (women's 75 kg)
Sharne Hawkins (women's 82.5 kg)

References

Malta Olympic Committee website
2006 Commonwealth Games website

Nations at the 2006 Commonwealth Games
Commonwealth Games
2006